Dean Huijsen (born 14 April 2005) is a Dutch footballer who plays as a centre-back for  club Juventus Next Gen.

Born in Amsterdam, Huijsen moved to Spain aged five and joined Costa Unida CF. In 2015, he moved to Málaga's youth sector, where he played until 2021, when he was bought by Juventus, being assigned to the under-17 team for the 2021–22 season. In 2022–23, he started playing for the under-19 team, but was later promoted to reserve team Juventus Next Gen in January 2023.

Club career 
Having started playing with Costa Unida CF de Marbella, before joining Málaga's youth set-up in 2015, aged 10. In 2021, he joined Juventus, after being contended by Real Madrid. In his first season, he played with the under-17 team, scoring seven goals. In the first half of the 2022–23 season, he scored six goals in 14 matches with the under-19s in all competitions.

In early January 2023, shortly after he trained and played a friendly against Rijeka with the first team during the winter break for the 2022 FIFA World Cup, Huijsen was promoted to Juventus Next Gen, the reserve team of Juventus. He subsequently made his professional debut on 8 January 2023, starting in a 2–1 league loss against Pordenone. He was booked at the seventh minute and scored with a 50th-minute header a goal which was disallowed for offside.

On 15 February, Huijsen scored his first professional goals, netting a brace in the second leg of a Coppa Italia Serie C semi-final match against Foggia: the game ended in a 2–1 win for his side (3–3 on aggregate) after 90 minutes, as Juventus Next Gen eventually won the tie on penalties.

International career 
Huijsen has represented the Netherlands at various youth international levels, having played for the under-16, under-17 and under-18 national teams.

In May 2022, he was included in the Dutch under-17 squad that took part in the UEFA European Under-17 Championship in Israel, where he scored two penalties in the group stage matches against France and Poland, as the Oranje eventually finished as runners-up after losing to France itself in the final.

Personal life 
Born in Amsterdam, Huijsen's family relocated to Marbella, Spain when he was five years old.

Career statistics

Honours

Netherlands U17 

 UEFA European Under-17 Championship runners-up: 2022

References 

Living people
2005 births
Dutch footballers
Netherlands youth international footballers
Málaga CF players
Juventus F.C. players
Juventus Next Gen players
Serie C players
Association football central defenders
Expatriate footballers in Spain
Expatriate footballers in Italy
Dutch expatriate footballers
Dutch expatriate sportspeople in Italy
Dutch expatriate sportspeople in Spain
Footballers from Amsterdam

External links